KVSI is a commercial radio station in Montpelier, Idaho, broadcasting to the Montpelier, Idaho-Paris, Idaho area on 1450 AM.

Translator
KVSI programming can also be heard on 101.7 MHz via an FM translator; this provides improved sound and better coverage than AM alone.

Annual events
Since 1978, KVSI has sponsored a Fun-Run that kicks off the Paris, Idaho July 4 celebration. Runners and walkers leave the KVSI station and finish in Paris, Idaho (8.6 miles).

References

External links
Official Website

Country radio stations in the United States
VSI